Hennadiy Mykolayovych Sushko (born 28 January 1970) is a Ukrainian football coach and a former player.

References

1970 births
People from Popasna
Living people
Soviet footballers
FC Shakhtar Stakhanov players
FC Spartak Ivano-Frankivsk players
Ukrainian footballers
FC Mariupol players
Ukrainian Premier League players
FC Zhemchuzhina Sochi players
Ukrainian expatriate footballers
Expatriate footballers in Russia
Russian Premier League players
FC Zorya Luhansk players
FC Shakhtar Sverdlovsk players
Ukrainian football managers
Association football defenders
Sportspeople from Luhansk Oblast